Landis is a town in Rowan County, North Carolina,  United States. At the 2020 census, its population was 3,109. The town is located just north of Kannapolis and south of China Grove.

History
Landis was incorporated in 1901 and began as a textile town, with its largest mill being Linn Mill Company.

Demographics

2020 census

As of the 2020 United States census, there were 3,690 people, 959 households, and 775 families residing in the town.

Education
Children in Landis are zoned for Landis Elementary School, Corriher-Lipe Middle School, and South Rowan High School (Landis. Rowan-Cabarrus Community College is 3.7 miles south of Landis in the nearby town of Kannapolis and is the closet institution of higher education, followed by Shaw University's CAPE Center, North Carolina Research Campus, Ambassador Christian College, and Livingstone College.

Notable person
Billy Ray Barnes, former professional American football player and coach

References

External links
 Town of Landis official website

Towns in Rowan County, North Carolina
Towns in North Carolina